Eckstein is a surname of German origin, meaning "cornerstone" (eck means 'corner', and stein means 'stone'). According to information gleaned from the U.S. Census, around 2,500 people in the United States have the surname Eckstein. Notable people with the surname include:

 Anna B. Eckstein, (1868-1947) German peace activist
 Arthur Eckstein, American historian
 Ashley Eckstein (born 1981), American actress and fashion designer
 Bernd Eckstein, (Born 1953) German ski jumper
 David Eckstein (born 1975), American baseball player
 Dieter Eckstein (born 1964), German footballer
 Emma Eckstein (1865–1924), early patient of Sigmund Freud
 Ernestine Eckstein (1941–1992), American Black, Feminist, and LGBT activist
 Ernst Eckstein (1845–1900), German humorist, novelist and poet
 Hans Eckstein (1908–1985), German water polo player
 Harry H. Eckstein, American political scientist
 Hermann Eckstein (1847–1893), German-born mining magnate and banker in South Africa
 John Eckstein (1736–1817), German artist
 Nathan Eckstein (1873–1945), German-born American businessman
 Otto Eckstein (1927–1984), German-born economist at Harvard University, and member of the U.S. President's Council of Economic Advisers
 Péter Eckstein-Kovács (born 1956), Romanian politician
 Rudolf Eckstein (1915–near 1939), German rower
 Shlomo Eckstein (1929-2020), Israeli economist and President of Bar-Ilan University
 Yechiel Eckstein (1951-2019), Israeli-American rabbi

See also
 Eckstein baronets, from a former baronetcy in the United Kingdom
 Nathan Eckstein Middle School, public school in Seattle, Washington
 Eckstine
 Eksteen

References 

German-language surnames
Jewish surnames